Kaattaruvi is a 1983 Indian Malayalam film, directed by J. Sasikumar. The film stars Sukumaran and Jalaja in the lead roles. The film has musical score by G. Devarajan.

Cast
Sukumaran as Munni
Jalaja as Radha
Mammootty as Vasu
Unni Mary as Mala
T. G. Ravi as Estate owner
Rajkumar Sethupathi as JamesKutty
Manavalan Joseph
അജയൻ
Alummoodan
Mannar RadhaKrishnan
Meena as Achamma
Anuradha
Prameela as Chellamma
Kanakalatha

Soundtrack
The music was composed by G. Devarajan and the lyrics were written by A. P. Gopalan.

References

External links
 

1983 films
1980s Malayalam-language films